Malandragem is  a Portuguese term for a lifestyle of idleness, fast living and petty crime – traditionally celebrated in samba lyrics, especially those of Noel Rosa and Bezerra da Silva. The exponent of this lifestyle, the malandro (masculine adjective), or "bad boy" (rogue, hustler, rascal, scoundrel, gangster), has become significant to Brazilian national identity as a folk hero or, rather, an anti-hero.

The concept is common in Brazilian literature,  Brazilian cinema and Brazilian music.

Definition
Malandragem is defined as any combination of strategies used in order to gain the advantage in a determined situation, typically of an illicit nature. It is characterized by savoir faire and subtlety. Its execution demands aptitude, charisma, cunning and whatever other characteristics (knacks) assist the malandro in the manipulation of people or institutions to obtain the best outcome with the least possible effort. 

Disregarding logical argumentation, labor and honesty, the malandro assumes that such methods are incapable of getting him a good outcome. Those who practice malandragem act in the manner of the popular Brazilian adage, immortalized in a catch-phrase from former Brazilian soccer player Gérson de Oliveira Nunes in a cigarette TV commercial (hence the name it was given: Lei de Gérson, or Gérson's law):  “I like to gain the advantage in everything.”

Together with the concept of jeitinho, malandragem can be considered another typical—but not exclusive—Brazilian mode of social navigation. Unlike jeitinho, however, with malandragem the integrity of institutions and individuals can be effectively damaged, legally speaking as malicious. Successful malandragem presupposes that the advantages are gained without being exposed. In other words, the malandro dupes the otário (sucker) with the latter not noticing that.

Malandragem is characterized in the Brazilian popular imagination as a tool for individual justice. Facing the forces of oppressive institutions, the individualist malandro survives by manipulating people, fooling authorities, and sidestepping laws in a way which guarantees his well-being. In this way, the malandro is a typical Brazilian hero. Literary examples include Pedro Malasarte and João Grilo.

Like jeitinho, malandragem is an intellectual resource utilized by individuals of little social influence or by the socially disadvantaged. This does not stop the equal use of malandragem by those of better social positions. Through malandragem, one gains illicit advantages in gambling, business, and in the totality of their social life.  One can consider to be a malandro the adulterer who convinces a woman of his false fidelity; the employer who finds a way to pay his employees less than what he owes; the player who manipulates his cards and wins the hand.

A malandro could be defined as someone who:
 Never works and lives off scams; a con man
 Has shallow, uncommitted romantic relationships;
 Leads a bohemian life of only fun and pleasure; 
 Is lazy, sluggish; 
 Cheats and deceives in order to prevail; a trickster.

But, despite this apparent egocentrical, lying and malicious nature, the person who makes use of malandragem is not necessarily selfish. He could possibly be lazy, but the malandro is not careless with the people around him. He generally doesn't use malandragem to take advantage of another person intending to harm others, but rather only to find a way out of an unfair situation even if this means resorting to illegal methods. In fictional contexts, malandragem is often a device used to introduce wit, a typical plot device/characteristic of an antihero.

See also
Gérson's law
Jineterismo
Jeitinho

References

Brazilian cultural conventions
Slang terms for men
Stereotypes
Stock characters
Subcultures
Crime in Brazil